Draper railway station is located on the Outer Harbor line. Situated in the north-western Adelaide suburb of Largs North, it is 17.2 kilometres from Adelaide station.

History 

It is unclear when this station opened.

Draper is one of the few stations in Adelaide not named after a current suburb. Draper was a suburb or locality to the north of Largs Bay Estate and south of Taperoo and Osborne, in what is now Largs North. One, as yet, unsourced report suggests Draper was named after a drapery that used to exist nearby (corner of Strathfield Terrace and Victoria Road). In the mid 1980s, the drapery closed and the site has housed a number of different shops since including a pet shop and a fish shop. The shop was recently demolished, to make way for housing.

Services by platform

References

Railway stations in Adelaide
Lefevre Peninsula